is a village located in Nagano Prefecture, Japan. , the village had an estimated population of 2,877 in 1116 households, and a population density of 20 persons per km².

Geography
Kiso is located in west-central Nagano Prefecture, in the valley of the Kiso River.

Surrounding municipalities
Nagano Prefecture
 Matsumoto
 Shiojiri
 Kiso (town)
 Asahi

Climate
The village has a climate characterized by characterized by cool and humid summers, and cold winters with heavy snowfall (Köppen climate classification Dfb).  The average annual temperature in Iijima is 5.7 °C. The average annual rainfall is 1860 mm with September as the wettest month. The temperatures are highest on average in August, at around 18.6 °C, and lowest in January, at around -6.7 °C.

Demographics
Per Japanese census data, the population of Kiso has decreased over the past 30 years.

History
Kiso village is located in former Shinano Province. The area developed as Yabuhara-juku, a post station on the Nakasendō highway connecting Edo with Kyoto during the Edo period. The present village of Kiso was established on April 1, 1889 by the establishment of the modern municipalities system.

Transportation

Railway
 JR Tōkai – Chūō Main Line

Highway

References

External links

Official Website 

 
Villages in Nagano Prefecture